The 1955–56 Liga Bet season was the first in which Liga Bet was the third tier of Israeli football due to the formation of Liga Leumit.

Maccabi Hadera (North Division champions) and Maccabi Sha'arayim (South Division champions) qualified for the promotion/relegation play-offs against the 9th- and 10th-placed clubs in Liga Alef.

North Division

South Division

Promotion play-offs
A promotion-relegation play-off between the 9th and 10th-placed teams in Liga Alef, Ahva Notzrit Haifa and Beitar Jerusalem, and the winners of the regional divisions of Liga Bet, Maccabi Sha'arayim and Maccabi Hadera. Each team played the other three once.

Notes

References
1955-56  Bnei Yehuda 
Beitar Jerusalem in top of the play-offs table Maariv, 26.8.56, Historical Jewish Press 
Beitar Jerusalem 4-2 Maccabi Hadera Heruth, 2.9.56, Historical Jewish Press 
In Sports Heruth, 6.4.56, Historical Jewish Press 
Football (Page 19) M. Almog, Hapoel 1956, 1956, www.infocenters.co.il (Hapoel Archive) 

Liga Bet seasons
Israel
3